Pembroke Square may refer to:

  Pembroke Square, London, England
 Pembroke Square, Oxford, England